New Jersey Alliance FC is an American soccer team based out of Lyndhurst, NJ. The team was founded in 2012 and plays in the NISA Nation, in the Northeast Region. NJAFC's colors are yellow, white and blue are the official colors.

History
New Jersey Alliance FC were founded in 2012 by Edgar Guardia, a local entrepreneur from Lyndhurst, New Jersey. The club joined the Garden State Soccer League and later the UPSL by reaching the 5th tier of US soccer pyramid.
On 27 August 2021 NISA Nation, a 4th tier league, announced that the team was going to join the league as founder club in the 2021 NISA Nation season.
The team tried to qualify for the 2022 U.S. Open Cup but was eliminated by Westchester United FC.
The club started 2021 NISA Nation season with a home win 16–0 over Bearfight FC.

Organization 
Was founded in 2012 as Lyndhurst Alliance FC.

At some point in time, the organization's name was changed to North Jersey Alliiance FC, Lydhurst, NJ.

On December 12, 2019: NORTH JERSEY ALLIANCE FC, EIN 82-2716932, of Lyndhurst, NJ received determination letter issued by the IRS for tax-exempt 501(c)(3) status, with effective date of exemption September 7, 2017.

On May 5, 2020, NORTH JERSEY ALLIANCE FC's tax-exempt status was revoked. "Organizations whose federal tax exempt status was automatically revoked for not filing a Form 990-series return or notice for three consecutive years."

On March 12, 2022, NEW JERSEY ALLIANCE FC, EIN: 87-4233669, of Lyndhurst, NJ received determination letter issued by the IRS for tax-exempt 501(c)(3) status, with effective date of exemption January 4, 2022.

Year-by-year

Players

History of NJ Alliance FC's Organization's Structure 
2012: North Jersey Alliance Futbol Club (NJAFC), based out of Lyndhurst, NJ, was founded in 2012 by Edgar Guardia.

2019: North Jersey Alliance Fc of Lyndhurst, NJ, received their 501(c)(3) tax exempt status from the IRS under EIN 82-2716932.

References

2012 establishments in New Jersey
National Independent Soccer Association teams
Soccer clubs in New Jersey
Lyndhurst, New Jersey